Marijkedorp (Lokono: Wan Shi Sha) is a village of indigenous Lokono people in the Albina resort of the Marowijne District of Suriname. Grace Watamaleo has been the village captain since 2011. 

In the 1970s, Albina and Marijkedorp started become a single urban area. Marijkedorp is depended on Albina for education and healthcare. The Lokono language has nearly disappeared from Marijkedorp and replaced by Dutch. In 2021, an initiative was launched to revitalise the language.

Nature reserve
Marijkedorp and the village of Alfonsdorp are in an ongoing dispute over the Wanekreek Nature Reserve, as both consider it part of their traditional hunting and fishing grounds. The reserve has not been inhabited since the 1950s.

References

Bibliography

External links
 Chietsana Foundation in Marijkedorp

Indigenous villages in Suriname
Populated places in Marowijne District